Hyposmocoma wahikanake is a species of moth of the family Cosmopterigidae. It is endemic to Lanai.

The wingspan is 7.7 mm for males and 6.2–7.1 mm for females.

The larvae have been reared on lichens growing on the bark of Casuarina and Eucalyptus species. The larvae live in a larval case which has the form of a candywrapper-shaped structure with one entrance at each end. In the wild, it is covered with bits of lichen and has a bright green, yellow or orange appearance depending on the type of lichen used.

Etymology
The specific name is derived from the Hawaiian wahi (meaning wrapper) and kanake (meaning candy) and refers to the type of case of this species which resembles the symmetrically twisted shape of a small candy in its wrapper.

References

wahikanake
Endemic moths of Hawaii
Moths described in 2011